Tristan Lamasine and Laurent Lokoli were the defending champions, but Lokoli decided not to participate this year. Lamasine played alongside Jonathan Eysseric, but they lost to James Cluskey and Alexandre Sidorenko in the first round.

Rémi Boutillier and Maxime Teixeira won the tournament, defeating Guilherme Clezar and Nicolás Kicker in the final, 6–3, 4–6, [10–8].

Seeds

Draw

Draw

References
 Main Draw

Internationaux de Tennis de Blois
2015 Doubles